Iggesund is a locality situated in Hudiksvall Municipality, Gävleborg County, Sweden with 3,362 inhabitants in 2010.

Geography
The nearest bigger cities are Sundsvall (pop. 49,339)  to the north, and Gävle (pop. 68,700)  to the south.

History
Iggesund was mentioned for the first time during the 15th century. At the time Iggesund consisted only of a few farms on both sides of the Iggåns.

 1546 – Swedish king Gustav Vasa established an eel fishery at the Iggån.
 1672 – Östanå paper mills were built on the northern shore of the Viksjön lake. They represented the first major industry in Iggesund.
 1685 – Iggesund's industrial era began with the completion of the Iggesunds Bruk iron mill. Iggesund slowly transformed from an agricultural into an industrial town. With the steady expansion of Iggesunds Bruk the town's name slowly turned into a synonym for the mill. 
 1721 – Russians troops burned down a large part of the industry and town.

Name
 around 1400: Igesunda 
 around 1500: Egesund, Eghesund, Eggesund, Iggesund, Iggsund

References 

Populated places in Hudiksvall Municipality
Hälsingland